Moon Princess, Lunar Princess, or Princess of the Moon may refer to:

Fictional characters 
Princess Kaguya, the protagonist of The Tale of the Bamboo Cutter
Sailor Moon, the main protagonist and title character of the manga series Sailor Moon
Dianna Soreil, a character in the anime television series Turn A Gundam
Feena Fam Earthlight, a character in the visual novel Yoake Mae yori Ruriiro na
Princess Luna, a character in the animated television series My Little Pony: Friendship Is Magic

Other uses 
The Princess of the Moon: A Confederate Fairy Story, an 1869 novel by Cora Semmes Ives
Tsukihime, a 2000 Japanese visual novel